Conexus Credit Union is Saskatchewan's largest credit union. Conexus has over $8 billion in consolidated assets, more than 130,000 members, and 30 branches across the province. More than 900 employees and sales professionals are located throughout the province.

History
In 1937, Tom Molloy, a reporter turned labour leader organized and created the Regina Co-operative Savings and Credit Union, which later came to be named Sherwood Credit Union. Sherwood Credit Union (later Conexus Credit Union) in 1976 implemented the first automated teller machine in Canada at its two branches in Regina. The project was developed for Sherwood Credit Union by the IT staff of CIS (Co-operative Insurance Services - later CGI) under contract to Saskatchewan Cooperative Credit Services (later Saskcentral). This venture involved cooperation from IBM Canada.

References

External links
Conexus Credit Union website

Credit unions of Saskatchewan
Companies based in Regina, Saskatchewan